Teodosia Osir, also Teddie Osir, is a Kenyan lawyer and corporate executive, who is the general counsel and head of corporate affairs at Kenya Airways, an international airline based in Nairobi, the capital and largest city in Kenya.

Background and education
Osir is a graduate of the University of Nairobi School of Law, where she obtained her Bachelor of Laws degree. She also holds a Postgraduate Diploma in Law, awarded by the Kenya School of Law. From 1986 until 1987, she studied at the University of the West Indies at its campus in Cave Hill, Saint Michael, Barbados, where she graduated with a Higher Diploma in Legislative Drafting. In 2007, she obtained a Diploma in Employee Relations, from the National University of Singapore.

Career
Osir is a professional lawyer and a member of the Kenya Bar. She has worked in various capacities, both inside and outside of Kenya. For about one year, from October 2006 until October 2007, she was an associate director at David Lawrence and Associates, a corporate recruitment company for C-Suite executives, based in Singapore.

From November 2007 until March 2011, she worked as a contract specialist for Qatar Airways. She was then hired by Kenya Airways as the head of legal services from April 2011 until November 2017. In this position, she handled all of the company's commercial transactions, including equipment purchases and leases and related matters.

In November 2017, the company , created a new department named Department of Corporate Affairs, charged with handling public relations, investor relations, legal matters,  strategy and special projects. Osir's was promoted to general counsel to head the new department.

Family
She is married to Ellie Osir. Their son, Jeremy Ominde Osir, majored in economics at the University of North Carolina in the United States.

See also
 Rebecca Miano
 MaryJane Mwangi
 Sauda Rajab

References

External links
Website of Kenya Airways

Year of birth missing (living people)
Living people
University of Nairobi alumni
Kenya School of Law alumni
University of the West Indies alumni
National University of Singapore alumni
20th-century Kenyan lawyers
Kenyan women lawyers
Kenyan business executives
Kenyan women business executives
21st-century Kenyan lawyers